The 2007 Deadly Awards took place at the Sydney Opera House Concert Hall. Featured guests included many people associated with the 1967 Referendum. Guest performances included Jessica Mauboy, Casey Donovan, Lou Bennett, Michael Tuahine and Kutcha Edwards, and several South Sydney Rabbitohs.  The awards were an annual celebration of Australian Aboriginal and Torres Strait Islander achievement in music, sport, entertainment and community.

Winners

Music
Most Promising New Talent in Music: Sharon-Lee Lane
Single Release of the Year: "Your Love is Like A Song" - Dan Sultan
Album Release of the Year: Cannot Buy My Soul - Kev Carmody
Band of the Year: Black Image
Artist of the Year: Jessica Mauboy
Jimmy Little Lifetime Achievement Award for Contribution to Aboriginal and Torres Strait Islander Music: Jimmy Little
APRA Song of the Year: "Going Back Home" - Troy Cassar-Daley

Sport
Most Promising New Talent in Sport: Dale Richards
Outstanding Achievement in AFL: Lance Franklin
Outstanding Achievement in Rugby League: Johnathan Thurston
Male Sportsperson of the Year: Anthony Mundine
Female Sportsperson of the Year: Rohanee Cox
The Ella Lifetime Achievement Award for Contribution to Aboriginal and Torres Strait Islander Sport: David Peachey

The arts
Dancer of the Year: Elma Kris
Outstanding Achievement in Film, Television or Theatre: Richard Frankland, Director of The Circuit
Outstanding Achievement in Literature: Dr Anita Heiss - Not Meeting Mr Right
Outstanding Achievement in Entertainment: Luke Carroll and Catherine Freeman - Going Bush
Male Actor of the Year: Aaron Pedersen
Female Actor of the Year: Deborah Mailman
Visual Artist of the Year: Dennis Nona

Community
Outstanding Achievement in Aboriginal and Torres Strait Islander Education: Gavin Khan
Outstanding Achievement in Aboriginal and Torres Strait Islander Health: Gracelyn Smallwood
Broadcaster of the Year: Sandy Dann
Apprentice or Trainee of the Year: Margaret Ross
Young Leader of the Year: Tania Major, winner of the 2007 Young Australian of the year.

References

External links
2007 Deadly Awards at Vibe

2007 in Australian music
The Deadly Awards
Indigenous Australia-related lists